Paolo Ceccon (born 13 September 1996) is an Italian slalom canoeist who has competed at the international level since 2011.

He won a bronze medal in the C1 team event at the 2022 World Championships in Augsburg.

References

External links

Living people
Italian male canoeists
Medalists at the ICF Canoe Slalom World Championships
1996 births
21st-century Italian people